Arba or ARBA may refer to:

Places
 Arba (Achaea), a town in ancient Achaea, Greece
 Arba, Friuli-Venezia Giulia, a comune (municipality) in Italy
 Arba, Illyria, ancient name of modern Rab in Croatia
 Arba, Indiana, an unincorporated community in the United States

Other uses 
 Arba (beetle), a genus of insects in the subfamily Prioninae
 Arba (biblical figure), a man mentioned in the Bible
 Académie Royale des Beaux-Arts, a Belgian art school
 American Rabbit Breeders Association
 American Rare Breed Association, an American kennel club
 American Revolution Bicentennial Administration
 Ariba, an American software and information technology services company
 Roman Catholic Diocese of Arba, a titular see

See also
Arba Sicula, a nonprofit society for the preservation and promotion of the Sicilian language and culture